File:
Franz is a small lunar impact crater identified during the Apollo mission in August 1971 and located along the eastern edge of the Sinus Amoris, a bay that forms a northern extension to the Mare Tranquillitatis. Its diameter is 25 km. It was named after German astronomer Julius Heinrich Franz. It lies to the southwest of the prominent crater Macrobius. To the north is the smaller Carmichael, and to the northwest is the diminutive Theophrastus.

The rim of this crater has been eroded due to subsequent impacts, although it retains a generally circular form. The interior has been flooded, leaving only a narrow inner wall and a low surviving rim. This floor has the same albedo as the surrounding terrain, and is not as dark as the lunar mare surface to the north and west. Attached to the exterior of the eastern rim is Proclus E, a merged double-crater formation. Proclus lies to the east across the Palus Somni, or Marsh of Sleep.

References

 
 
 
 
 
 
 
 
 
 
 

Impact craters on the Moon